The H-2B visa nonimmigrant program permits employers to hire foreign workers to come temporarily to the United States and perform temporary nonagricultural services or labor on a one-time, seasonal, peakload or intermittent basis.

The H-2B visa classification requires the United States Secretary of Homeland Security to consult with appropriate agencies before admitting H-2B non-immigrants. Homeland Security regulations require that, except for Guam, the petitioning employer first apply for a temporary labor certification from the United States Secretary of Labor indicating that:  (1) there are not sufficient U.S. workers who are capable of performing the temporary services or labor at the time of filing the petition for H-2B classification and at the place where the foreign worker is to perform the work; and (2) the employment of the foreign worker will not adversely affect the wages and working conditions of similarly employed U.S. workers. The Department of Labor will review and process all H-2B applications on a first in, first out basis.

Employers seeking to employ temporary H-2B workers must apply for Temporary Employment Certification to the Chicago National Processing Center (NPC). An employer may submit a request for multiple unnamed foreign workers as long as each worker is to perform the same services or labor, on the same terms and conditions, in the same occupation, in the same area of intended employment during the same period of employment. Certification is issued to the employer, not the worker, and is not transferable from one employer to another or from one worker to another.

Temporary Increases 
Although capped at 66,000 per year, the H-2B numerical cap was increased in 2017 by then United States Secretary of Homeland Security John Kelly. These visas were made available only to American businesses which attested that they would likely suffer irreparable harm without the ability to employ all the H-2B workers requested in their original petition.

Statistics 
Below are H-2B visas issued each year as released by the U.S. Department of State - Bureau of Consular Affairs.

See also
Guest worker program
H-2A Visa

Notes

External links and further reading
"H-2B Temporary Non-Agricultural Workers" U.S. Citizenship and Immigration Services, accessed April 5, 2018
"Maps: Impact of H-2B Guest Workers in 2017" report by Preston Huennekens, Center for Immigration Studies, April 2018 
Application process and documentation required for H-2B Visa petitioners
"Cap Count for H-2B Nonimmigrants" on the website of ILW.com, Immigration Daily, February 1, 2012

United States visas by type
Employment of foreign-born